Morteza Yekkeh is a retired Iranian forward who played for the Iran national football team in the 1986 Asian Games. He formerly played for Gostaresh Tehran, Esteghlal Tehran and the  Iran national football team.

References

External links
 
 Morteza Yekkeh at TeamMelli.com

Iran international footballers
Iranian footballers
Esteghlal F.C. players
Shahin FC players
Living people
Footballers at the 1986 Asian Games
Association football forwards
Year of birth missing (living people)
Asian Games competitors for Iran